William Criswell Owen (September 29, 1903 – March 15, 1975) was an American football player who played in the National Football League (NFL) for the New York Giants, Cleveland Bulldogs, and Detroit Wolverines. He was the brother of Pro Football Hall of Fame coach Steve Owen.

See also

 History of the New York Giants (1925–78)

References

External links
 

1903 births
1975 deaths
American football guards
American football tackles
Cleveland Bulldogs players
Detroit Wolverines (NFL) players
New York Giants players
Phillips Haymakers football players
People from Alfalfa County, Oklahoma
Players of American football from Oklahoma